Zike is a village in Nimba County, Liberia.

Populated places in Liberia
Nimba County